Alston Branch is a  long 1st order tributary to the Leipsic River in Kent County, Delaware. It is only 6 miles away from the state's capital, Dover, Delaware.

Course
Alston Branch rises on the Fork Branch divide in Cheswold, Delaware.  Alston Branch then flows northeasterly to meet the Leipsic River about 1-mile north-northeast of Bishops Corner.

Watershed
Alston Branch drains  of area, receives about 45.1 in/year of precipitation, has a topographic wetness index of 586.36 and is about 4% forested.

References

Rivers of Delaware
Rivers of Kent County, Delaware
Tributaries of the Leipsic River